The many-scaled gecko (Geckolepis polylepis) is a species of lizard in the family Gekkonidae. It is endemic to western Madagascar.

References

Geckolepis
Reptiles described in 1893